The Coulomb Affair was a conflict between Emma and Alexis Coulomb, on one side, and Helena Blavatsky and the Theosophical Society, on the other.

Blavatsky met Emma and Alexis in 1871 in Cairo. They founded the short-lived Société Spirite. In August 1879, Emma and Alexis contacted Blavatsky because they had financial problems. They were stranded in Sri Lanka, and Blavatsky helped them to get to Bombay and tried to find a job for them. As she could not find a job for them, she provided them with a position in the Theosophical Society, where they did various chores, such as cooking and gardening. 
In February 1884, Blavatsky and H. S. Olcott travelled to Europe. After their departure, a conflict between the Coulombs and the Theosophical Society escalated. The Coulombs tried to blackmail and threaten Blavatsky, whereupon Blavatsky dismissed them. 
When the theosophists inspected Blavatsky's room after the Coulombs had to leave, they found secret doors in her room . Alexis claimed that he constructed these secret doors for Blavatsky. Theosophists have said that Alexis' constructions were obviously newly built, and the secret doors could not be opened or closed silently or without strong effort.

After the Coulombs were dismissed, they went to their Christian missionary friends of the Free Church of Scotland, and gave them letters that were allegedly written by Blavatsky to Emma. These letters suggested that Blavatsky was a fraud. The chaplain George Patterson published extracts from these letters in the Madras Christian College Magazine. The incident became well known all over India and also in America and Europe. Blavatsky then immediately published a reply in several newspapers. Blavatsky and Olcott then travelled back to India in the end of 1884. Soon afterwards the Hodgson Report was published, which also severely damaged Blavatsky's reputation. The report also contained the allegations of the Coulombs.

In 1986 and 1997, Vernon Harrison of the Society for Psychical Research published a study on the Hodgson Report. The Blavatsky–Coulomb letters were destroyed by Elliott Coues, an enemy of Blavatsky, so that they cannot be studied.

See also 
Hodgson Report
Incidents in the Life of Madame Blavatsky

Literature
 Besant, Annie: H. P. Blavatsky und die Meister der Weisheit. Theosophisches Verlagshaus, Leipzig 1924
 Coulomb, Emma: Some account of my association with Madame Blavatsky from 1872 to 1884. Lawrence Asylum Press, Madras 1884
 Harrison, Vernon: H. P. Blavatsky und die SPR, Eine Untersuchung des Hodgson Berichtes aus dem Jahre 1885. Theosophischer Verlag 1998; 
 Hartmann, Franz: Wahrheit und Dichtung, Die Theosophische Gesellschaft und der Wunderschrank von Adyar. o.O. 1906

External links
 "The Theosophical Movement 1875–1950", Cunningham Press, 1951 (page 82ff.)
 "The Collapse of Koot Hoomi" by Rev. George Patterson, Madras Christian College Magazine (1884)
 "Statement of a Visitor"  by Franz Hartmann, reprinted from Report of the Result of an Investigation into the Charges against Madame Blavatsky Brought by the Missionaries of the Scottish Free Church of Madras, and Examined by a Committee Appointed for That Purpose by the General Council of the Theosophical Society, 1885, pp. 139–144.
 "The Testimony of Emma Coulomb" by Emma Coulomb, from "The Report of the Committee Appointed to Investigate the Phenomena connected with the Theosophical Society," Proceedings of the Society for Psychical Research, 1885.
 "The Coulomb Conspiracy Against Theosophy", ch. 13 in H. P. Blavatsky and the Theosophical Movement, by Charles J. Ryan, 1937

Helena Blavatsky
Theosophical Society